Moulins – Montbeugny Airport  is an aerodrome or airport located in Toulon-sur-Allier,  southeast of Moulins and west of Montbeugny, all communes in the Allier department of the Auvergne region in central France.

Facilities 

Airlines and destinations 
There is no scheduled commercial air service at this time.

References

External links 
 Aéroport de Moulins - Montbeugny at Union des Aéroports Français 

Airports in Auvergne-Rhône-Alpes
Buildings and structures in Allier